Eze Kingsley Obumneme (born 22 November 1991) is a Nigerian professional footballer who plays as a defender for Al-Suwaiq in the Oman Professional League.

Career

India
Kingsley Obumneme has spent the majority of his career playing in the I-League in India. He has played for clubs such as United, in I-league 2nd division and Peerless in the Calcutta Football League.

Aizawl
On 24 December 2016, Obumneme signed with professional I-League side Aizawl. He made his debut for the club on 7 January 2017 against East Bengal. He started the match and played the full ninety minutes as Aizawl drew 1–1.

Mohun Bagan A.C
In 2017, he signed A One year contract with Mohun Bagan in the I-League 2017–18 Season.

Career statistics

Club

Honours and titles

Club
Aizawl FC
I-League(1): 2016-17
Mohun Bagan
Calcutta Football League (1): 2018–19
Mohammedan SC
I-League 2nd Division(1): 2019–20

References

Living people
Nigerian footballers
Aizawl FC players
Association football defenders
Calcutta Football League players
Mizoram Premier League players
I-League players
Nigerian expatriate footballers
Expatriate footballers in India
Nigerian expatriate sportspeople in India
1996 births